Leucospermum formosum is a large upright shrub of up to  high, from the family Proteaceae. It grows from a single trunk and its branches are greyish felty. From above, the heads look like turning wheels. It is called silver-leaf wheel-pincushion in English. It flowers during September and October. It is an endemic species of the Western Cape province of South Africa.

Description 

When the flowers open, the styles grow rapidly, first breaking through the perianth claws and curve away from the center of the head, until the pollen presenter also ruptures the limbs at the top of the perianth.

The middle part (or claws), are threat-shaped at their base but somewhat broadening higher up, with long hairs on the outer surface, all strongly curled back after the flower opens. The upper part (or limbs), which enclosed the pollen presenter in the bud, are very narrowly lance-shaped with a pointy tip, each about 7 mm long and 1 mm wide, set with many long soft hair, more of less forming a tuft at the tip.

Taxonomy 
During November 1773, Francis Masson and Carl Peter Thunberg passed through the Langeberg Range via the Attaquas Kloof, between Mosselbay and Oudtshoorn. Here, they presumably collected ripe seeds on the southern slopes, near the current Ruitersbos Forest Reserve. The first validly published description of the silver-leaf wheel-pincushion, was based on material grown from Masson's seeds by Lee and Kennedy. This description was accompanied by a colour plate, that nicely shows its diagnostic characters. It was made by Henry Cranke Andrews in 1798, who called it Protea formosa. Specimens from Ruitersbos (near the Attaquas Kloof) closely match Andrews' illustration, although the downy lance-shaped leaves are characteristic for young plants that flower for the first time (older plants mostly have leaves with three teeth). In 1809, Richard Anthony Salisbury, who studied living plants in his garden at Chapel Allerton, Yorkshire, where the species had flowered and even produces ripe seeds, assigned it to his genus Leucadendrum. His contemporary, Robert Brown, considerably complicated the nomenclature by citing Protea formosa Andrews as a synonym of his own name Leucospermum medium (now Leucospermum vestitum), while newly describing at the same time an additional species, Protea formosa R.Br.. So the name Protea formosa, is not only a later homonym of the name Andrews coined, but also a later synonym to his own Protea compacta. Later authors stuck to Brown's name, even though there is little resemblance between Andrews' P. formosa and Brown's L. medium. Robert Sweet combined Andrews' species name with Brown's genus Leucospermum in 1818. In 1891, Otto Kuntze assigned the species to his wider delineation of the genus Leucadendron, creating the new combination Leucadendron formosum.

Leucospermum formosum is the type species of the fireworks pincushions, section Cardinistyle.

The species name formosum is Latin and means "beautiful" or "finely formed".

Distribution, habitat and ecology  
L. formosum is only known from a few scattered populations on southern slopes of the Riviersonderend Mountains, Langeberg and Outeniqua Mountains between the Duwelskop near George and the Dassieshoek Peak near Robertson. The most viable population can be found at Ruitersbos. No plants seem to remain at Garcia's Pass, where "the Prince of Collectors", Ernest Edward Galpin found the species in 1897. It grows in a tall dense sclerophyll vegetation that further is dominated by Erica species, Restionaceae and other Proteaceae.

The flower heads are visited by nectar-feeding Cape sugarbirds and several species of sunbird. Because the length of the bill of the Cape sugarbird equals that of the style, it is probably the more effective pollinator. The birds sit on the flower head and delve into the perianths in search of nectar, at the same time powdering their heads and breasts with pollen from the pollen presenters, and later rubbing it off on the stigmas at the very tips of the styles. Bees and beetles also visit the flower heads but do not touch the pollen presenters and so do not pollinate. The seeds are covered by a fleshy coating that attracts ants, that is called elaiosome. The seeds fall about two months after flowering to the ground, where native ant species carry them to their nests, and the elaiosome is eaten. The remaining seed is smooth and hard and too big for the ants jaws to remove, and so remain safe from being eaten by rodents and birds and overhead fires. Adult plants are killed by the fire but the seeds respond to increased daily temperature fluctuations and chemicals washed down from the char and germinate, so reviving the species at that location.

Conservation 
The silver-leaf wheel-pincushion is considered an endangered species because it grows in an area of only , and half of the six previously known populations appear to have been lost. Losses are due to urban sprawl, afforestation, wild flower harvesting and competition by alien plant species.

References

External links 
 several photos

formosum
Endemic flora of South Africa
Plants described in 1798
Taxa named by Henry Cranke Andrews